Carmen Naranjo Coto (January 30, 1928 – January 4, 2012) was a Costa Rican novelist, poet and essayist.

Life
Naranjo was born in Cartago, the capital city of the Cartago Province. She received her primary education there at the Escuela República de Perú and her secondary at the Colegio Superior de Señoritas.

She received her licenciatura in Philology from the University of Costa Rica and pursued post-graduate studies at the Universidad Autónoma de México and the University of Iowa.

Naranjo served as Costa Rica's ambassador to Israel in the 1970s and also as the country's minister of culture (1974-1976). She was the author of the Costa Rican system of social security. She was inducted into La Galería de las Mujeres de Costa Rica (The Women's Gallery of Costa Rica) in 2005.

Literary career 
Naranjo wrote multiple books, including poetry, novels, storybooks, and essays. Her novels and stories have had much success, such as her first novel Los perros no ladraron (1966); however, Naranjo is also known for her poetry, such as La canción de la ternura (1964) and Hacia tu isla (1966).

After Naranjo returned to Costa Rica in 1964, having worked for United Nations in Venezuela, her literary career began to take off. She enrolled in a writer's workshop, led by Lilia Ramos (Costa Rican essayist), she began reading work by Latin American authors such as Carlos Fuentes, Juan Rulfo, Jorge Luis Borges, and Octavio Paz, and she published her first volumes of poetry, Hacia tu isla (1966) and Misa a oscuras (1964). She published her first novel, Los perros no ladraron in 1966, and in 1968, two more followed: Memorias de un hombre de palabra and Camino al mediodía. The success she had from her first three novels opened an international opportunity for her career and literary reputation. Upon accepting an invitation to the University of Iowa in the United States, Naranjo spent a year in 1969 in the Iowa Writers' Workshop, where she completed her next novel,  Diario de una multitud (published in 1974).

In 1970, after much success with Camino al mediodía, which won second place in The Central American and Panama Flower Games (Los Juegos Florales Centroamericanos y de Panamá), she began to teach workshops (writing classes), and as a direct result of these classes, Naranjo was inspired to write her next notable novel, Responso Por El Niño Juan Manuel (1970).

Bibliography
Cancion de la ternura, 1964
Misa a oscuras, 1964
Hacia tu isla, 1966
Los perros no ladraron, 1966
Memorias de un hombre palabra, 1968
Diario de una multitud, 1974
Cinco años en busca de un pensador, 1977
Mi guerrilla, 1977
Nunca hubo alguna vez, 1984
El caso 117.720, 1987
En partes, 1994
Más allá del Parismina, 2001
En esta tierra redonda y plana, 2001
Marina Jiménez de Bolandi: recordándola, 2002
El Truco Florido,

Translations of her short stories into English include:
Rosario Santos (ed.), And We Sold the Rain: Contemporary Fiction from Central America (title story in the collection), Seven Stories Press, (2nd edition 1996); 
Barbara Ras (ed.), Costa Rica: A Traveler's Literary Companion, Whereabouts Press (1993); 
Linda Britt (trans.), There Never Was a Once Upon a Time, Latin American Literary Review Press (1989); 
Andrés Alfaro (trans.), "Wouldn't You Believe It?" Trinity Jolt Journal of Literary Translation. Vol. 2. (Apr. 2014). Translated from the short story "A qué no me van a creer?" by Carmen Naranjo.

References

External links
 First Congress of Central American Women Writers, Nicaragua

1928 births
2012 deaths
Costa Rican novelists
20th-century Costa Rican poets
People from Cartago Province
University of Costa Rica alumni
National Autonomous University of Mexico alumni
University of Iowa alumni
Ambassadors of Costa Rica to Israel
Government ministers of Costa Rica
Deaths from cancer in Costa Rica
Costa Rican women essayists
Women novelists
Costa Rican women poets
20th-century novelists
20th-century women writers
International Writing Program alumni
20th-century essayists
Women government ministers of Costa Rica
Costa Rican women ambassadors
20th-century Costa Rican women writers
21st-century Costa Rican women writers
20th-century Costa Rican writers
21st-century Costa Rican writers
Costa Rican expatriates in Mexico
Costa Rican expatriates in the United States
20th-century Costa Rican women politicians